Dalgety Bay railway station serves the town of Dalgety Bay in Fife, Scotland. Lying on the Fife Circle and EdinburghｰDundee lines, it is managed by ScotRail. It is currently the nearest railway station to Fordell Firs Camp site, the Scottish national headquarters for The Scout Association in Scotland, part of Scouting in Scotland.

History
The station is built close to the former station Donibristle Halt, opened in 1942  (closed 1959) as part of the Aberdour Line by the North British Railway, and named for the Earl of Moray's estate of Donibristle on which it stood. It is also close to the line of the former Fordell Railway, which operated from 1770 to 1946 and passed below the main line to the east of the station.

Facilities
The station is unstaffed and has two platforms, connected by a footbridge which is accessible via ramps or steps. The station is equipped with shelters on both platforms, with a self-service ticket machine located in the shelter on Platform 1.

Services

2008
Services are given in National Rail Timetable 242. There is a basic 30 minute service, with alternate trains serving  and the Fife Circle route via  to Edinburgh. Kirkcaldy services are periodically extended to Dundee.

2016

The same 30-minute base service remains, but daytime trains all now run beyond Kirkcaldy to  northbound.  One of the two terminates there, whilst the other returns to Edinburgh via Cowdenbeath.  In the evening trains run hourly and mostly run to Dundee or Perth, whilst on Sundays they run to Glenrothes & back to Edinburgh.

References

Notes

Sources

 

Railway stations in Fife
Railway stations served by ScotRail
Former London and North Eastern Railway stations
Railway stations in Great Britain opened in 1942
Railway stations in Great Britain closed in 1959
Railway stations opened by Railtrack
Railway stations in Great Britain opened in 1998
1942 establishments in Scotland
Dalgety Bay